The Third Secret is a 1964 British CinemaScope neo-noir psychological mystery thriller film directed by Charles Crichton and starring Stephen Boyd, Jack Hawkins, Richard Attenborough, Diane Cilento, Pamela Franklin, Paul Rogers and Alan Webb. The screenplay by Robert L. Joseph focuses on an American newscaster who investigates the mysterious death of his psychoanalyst. According to the film, there are three kinds of secrets; the first, you keep from others; the second, you keep from yourself, and the third is the truth.

Plot
Prominent London psychoanalyst Dr. Leo Whitset is discovered injured from a gunshot wound in his home by his housekeeper, and as he lies dying he whispers, "blame no one but me". These words lead the coroner to rule the death a suicide, a verdict questioned by one of Dr. Whitset's patients, Alex Stedman, a successful American news commentator for British television who has been in therapy since the death of his wife and daughter. The dead man's 14 year-old daughter Catherine is certain he was murdered, and she enlists Alex's aid in finding the killer to preserve her father's reputation.

Catherine provides Alex with the names of three other patients. Sir Frederick Belline is a respected judge, Alfred Price-Gorham runs a prestigious art gallery with his assistant Miss Humphries, and Anne Tanner is a corporate secretary. As Alex investigates their backgrounds, he discovers each of them, like himself, harbours a secret known only by the murdered man. Hoping to find more clues, Alex goes to the doctor's country home to search his files. There, he learns Catherine was under her father's care, and when he confronts her, she admits she killed the doctor when he threatened to send her to an institution to be treated for paranoid schizophrenia. While re-enacting the crime, Catherine stabs Alex and consequently she is confined to a psychiatric hospital. Recovered from his wounds, Alex visits her and promises to stay in touch. The third secret the doctor had hidden from himself was the seriousness of his daughter's illness, which made him delay committing her to a mental institution.

Cast
 Stephen Boyd as Alex Stedman
 Jack Hawkins as Sir Frederick Belline
 Richard Attenborough as Alfred Price-Gorham
 Diane Cilento as Anne Tanner
 Pamela Franklin as Catherine Whitset
 Paul Rogers as Dr. Milton Gillen
 Alan Webb as Alden Hoving
 Rachel Kempson as Mildred Hoving
 Peter Sallis as Lawrence Jacks
 Patience Collier as Mrs. Pelton
 Freda Jackson as Mrs. Bales
 Judi Dench as Miss Humphries
 Peter Copley as Dr. Leo Whitset
 Nigel Davenport as Lew Harding
 Charles Lloyd-Pack as Dermot McHenry
 Barbara Hicks as Police Secretary
 Ronald Leigh-Hunt as Police Officer (as Ronald Leigh Hunt)
 Geoffrey Adams as Floor Manager
 James Maxwell as Mark
 Gerald Case as Mr. Bickes
 Sarah Brackett as Nurse
 Neal Arden as Mr. Morgan

Production
Patricia Neal was cast as one of the doctor's patients, but all her scenes were cut from the film before it was released.

Crichton said he "really made" the film "because I needed a job" although he felt it "was quite an interesting picture." He says after they finished making the film the Zanucks took over Fox "and Zanuck decided he wanted to make pictures for the family and this was a strange mad picture so he cut out most of the mad bits which didn't help."

Box-office
According to Fox records, the film needed to earn $1,300,000 in film rentals to break even, and it made $615,000, resulting in a loss.

Critical reception
Howard Thompson of The New York Times wrote that the film "is recommended only to practitioners, patients and other moviegoers with a wry sense of humor. For in probing Freudian motivations and behavior to solve a crime, the picture obliquely strings out like a strand of loose spaghetti." He added: "[It] uncoils and meanders so deviously and pretentiously, and the dialogue slips into such metaphorical mishmash that the result is more often exasperating than entertaining – or convincing. The music, telegraphing dire things to come, is an atonal teaser." He concluded "[It] presses so hard for conversational effect and mood that simple suspense occurs only toward the end. The denouement is a good, logical shocker – unsurprising if you study the smoothest talker of the lot."

Variety called the film "an engrossing, if not altogether convincing, mystery melodrama of the weighty psychological school."

TV Guide rated the film 2½ out of four stars and commented: "The episodic, talky drama has some moments that overcome the script's deficiencies, but the film tends to be pretentious and deliberately obtuse. The performances are only adequate. Franklin is particularly good, however, as the troubled young girl."

Home video
The film has been released on DVD in the US (20th Century Fox, 2007) and UK (Odeon Entertainment, 2012), and on Blu-ray in the UK (Powerhouse Films, 2019).

References

External links

1964 films
1964 crime films
British mystery films
British detective films
CinemaScope films
Films shot at Associated British Studios
Films about murder
Films set in London
British black-and-white films
20th Century Fox films
Films directed by Charles Crichton
Films scored by Richard Arnell
Patricide in fiction
1960s English-language films
1960s British films